Chust is a district of Namangan Region in Uzbekistan. The capital is the city Chust. Its area is 937 km2. Its population is 269,300 (2021 est.).

The district consists of one city (Chust), 11 urban-type settlements (Olmos, Axcha, Sarimsoqtepa, Varzik, Qoraqoʻrgʻon, Gʻova, Karkidon, Karnon, Yorqishloq, Shoyon, Xisorak) and 11 rural communities.

References 

Districts of Uzbekistan
Namangan Region